The Sports Play Dylan (and Donovan) is an extended play (EP) by Australian rock band The Sports. The EP is five covers of Bob Dylan and Donovan tracks. It was released in November 1981 and peaked at number 70 on the Kent Music Report.

Track listing

Charts

References

1981 EPs
The Sports albums
EPs by Australian artists
Covers EPs